The Supreme Court of the State of New York is the trial-level court of general jurisdiction in the New York State Unified Court System. (Its Appellate Division is also the highest intermediate appellate court.) It is vested with unlimited civil and criminal jurisdiction, although in many counties outside New York City it acts primarily as a court of civil jurisdiction, with most criminal matters handled in County Court. 

The court is radically different from its counterparts in nearly all other states in that the Supreme Court is a trial court and is not the highest court in the state. The highest court of the State of New York is the Court of Appeals.  Also, although it is a trial court, the Supreme Court sits as a "single great tribunal of general state-wide jurisdiction, rather than an aggregation of separate courts sitting in the several counties or judicial districts of the state." The Supreme Court is established in each of New York's 62 counties.

Jurisdiction

Under the New York State Constitution, the New York State Supreme Court has unlimited jurisdiction in both civil and criminal cases, with the exception of certain monetary claims against the State of New York itself. In practice, the Supreme Court hears civil actions involving claims above a certain monetary amount (for example, $25,000 in New York City) that puts the claim beyond the jurisdiction of lower courts. Civil actions about lesser sums are heard by courts of limited jurisdiction, such as the New York City Civil Court, or the County Court, District Court, city courts, or justice courts (town and village courts) outside New York City.

The Supreme Court also hears civil cases involving claims for equitable relief, such as injunctions, specific performance, or rescission of a contract, as well as actions for a declaratory judgment. The Supreme Court also has exclusive jurisdiction of matrimonial actions, such as either contested or uncontested actions for a divorce or annulment. The court also has exclusive jurisdiction over "Article 78 proceedings" against a body or officer seeking to overturn an official determination on the grounds that it was arbitrary, capricious and unreasonable or contrary to law.

At English Common Law, the lord chancellor, not as a part of his equitable jurisdiction, but as the king's delegate to exercise the Crown’s special jurisdiction, had responsibility for the custody and protection of infants and the mentally incapacitated.   Upon the organization of the Supreme Court in New York the Legislature transferred so much of the law as formed a part of the king's prerogative to it.  The Appellate Divisions of the Supreme Court are responsible for oversight of the related programs.

In 1995, the New York Supreme Court established a trial level Commercial Division, beginning in New York County (Manhattan) and Monroe County (the 7th Judicial District). The Commercial Division has expanded to the 8th District (located in Buffalo), and the Albany, Kings, Nassau, Onondaga, Queens, Suffolk and Westchester County Supreme Courts.  These are specialized Business Courts, with a defined jurisdiction focusing on business and commercial litigation. The jurisdictional amount in controversy required to have a case heard in the Commercial Division varies among these Commercial Division courts, ranging from $50,000 in Albany and Onondaga Counties to $500,000 in New York County, but the Commercial Division rules (Section 202.70) are otherwise uniform.    

With respect to criminal cases, the Criminal Branch of Supreme Court tries felony cases in the five counties of New York City, whereas they are primarily heard by the County Court elsewhere. Misdemeanor cases, and arraignments in almost all cases, are handled by lower courts: the New York City Criminal Court; the District Court in Nassau County and the five western towns of Suffolk County; city courts; and justice courts, and so on.

Structure

Appellate Division

Appeals from Supreme Court decisions, as well as from the Surrogate's Court, Family Court, and Court of Claims, are heard by the New York Supreme Court, Appellate Division. This court is intermediate between the New York Supreme Court and the New York Court of Appeals.

There is one Appellate Division, which for administrative purposes comprises four judicial departments.

Decisions of the Appellate Division department panels are binding on the lower courts in that department, and also on lower courts in other departments unless there is contrary authority from the Appellate Division of that department.

Appellate terms
The Appellate Division of the Supreme Court in each judicial department is authorized to establish "appellate terms". An appellate term is an intermediate appellate court that hears appeals from the inferior courts within their designated counties or judicial districts, and are intended to ease the workload on the Appellate Division and provide a less expensive forum closer to the people.

Appellate terms are located in the 1st and 2nd Judicial Departments only, representing Downstate New York. These hear appeals from the New York City Civil Court, New York City Criminal Court, City Courts in the 1st and 2nd Departments, and District Court.  (City Courts in other departments appeal to the County Courts instead.)

The 1st Department has a single Appellate Term covering Manhattan and The Bronx.  The 2nd Department has two Appellate Terms.  The Appellate Term for the 2nd, 11th and 13th Judicial Districts covers Brooklyn, Queens, and Staten Island, and generally sits at 141 Livingston Street in Brooklyn.  The Appellate Term for the 9th and 10th Judicial Districts covers Nassau, Suffolk, Westchester, Rockland, Orange, Dutchess, and Putnam Counties; it generally rotates between the Westchester County Courthouse in White Plains, the Nassau County Supreme Court Building in Mineola, and the Cohalan Court Complex in Central Islip.  They occasionally sit at other locations within their jurisdiction.

Appellate terms consist of between three and five justices of the Supreme Court, appointed by the Chief Administrative Judge with the approval of presiding justice of the appropriate appellate division. The court sits in three-judge panels, with two justices constituting a quorum and being necessary for a decision. Decisions by the Appellate Term must be followed by courts whose appeals lie to it.

Criminal terms
In New York City, all felony cases are heard in criminal terms.

The Criminal Term of the Supreme Court, New York County is divided into 1 all purpose part, 15 conference and trial parts, 1 youth part, 1 narcotics/sci part, 1 felony waiver/sci part, 1 integrated domestic violence part, and 16 trial parts, which include 3 Judicial Diversion Parts and 1 Mental Health Part.

Civil terms
In New York City, all major civil cases are heard in civil terms.

Administration

The court system is divided into thirteen judicial districts: seven upstate districts each comprising between five and eleven counties, five districts corresponding to the boroughs of New York City, and one district on Long Island. In each judicial district outside New York City, an Administrator (or Administrative Judge if a judge) is responsible for supervising all courts and agencies, while inside New York City an Administrator (or Administrative Judge) supervises each major court. Administrators are assisted by Supervising Judges who are responsible in the on-site management of the trial courts, including court caseloads, personnel, and budget administration, and each manage a particular type of court within a county or judicial district. The Administrator is also assisted by the District Executive and support staff. The district administrative offices are responsible for personnel, purchasing, budgets, revenue, computer automation, court interpreters, court security, and case management. Opinions of the New York trial courts are published selectively in the Miscellaneous Reports.

Judges
A judge of the New York Supreme Court is titled "justice".

Elections

Supreme Court justices are elected. Justices are nominated by judicial district nominating conventions, with judicial delegates themselves elected from assembly districts. Some (political party) county committees play a significant role in their judicial district conventions, for example restricting nomination to those candidates that receive approval from a party screening committee. Sometimes, the parties cross-endorse each other's candidates, while at other times they do not and incumbent judges must actively campaign for re-election. Judicial conventions have been criticized as opaque, brief and dominated by county party leaders. In practice, most of the power of selecting justices belongs to local political party organizations, such as the Kings County Democratic County Committee (Brooklyn Democratic Party), which control the delegates. The process was challenged in litigation which ultimately resulted in a U.S. Supreme Court decision in N.Y. State Bd. of Elections v. Lopez Torres, which upheld the constitutionality of New York's judicial election system.

New York Supreme Court justices are elected to 14-year terms. A Supreme Court Justice's term ends, even if the 14-year term has not yet expired, at the end of the calendar year in reaching the age of 70. However, an elected Supreme Court Justice may obtain certification to continue in office, without having to be re-elected, for three two-year periods, until final retirement at the end of the year in which the Justice turns 76. These additional six years of service are available only for elected Supreme Court Justices, not for "Acting" Justices whose election or appointments were to lower courts.

Assignments

In many counties, the number of New York Supreme Court justices is fewer than the number of needed justices. For that reason, judges of the New York City Civil Court, New York City Criminal Court, New York Family Court, and New York Court of Claims are designated as Acting Supreme Court Justices.

Notable justices
 George G. Barnard 
 Richard J. Bartlett
 Benjamin N. Cardozo
 John Carro
 Richard J. Daronco
 Noah Davis
 Gerald Garson
 James Kent
 Barry Kramer
 Irving Lehman
 Samuel Leibowitz
 Edmund H. Lewis
 Henry Brockholst Livingston
 Joseph Lorigo
 Jeremiah T. Mahoney
 Daniel D. Tompkins
 Sol Wachtler
 Robert F. Wagner
 Raymond Walter

History
The New York Supreme Court is the oldest Supreme Court with general original jurisdiction. It was established as the Supreme Court of Judicature by the Province of New York on May 6, 1691.  That court was continued by the State of New York after independence was declared in 1776.  It became the New York Supreme Court under the New York Constitutional Convention of 1846.

In November 2004, the court system merged the operations of two separate criminal courts—the Bronx County Criminal Court and the Criminal Term of Bronx County Supreme Court—into a single trial court of criminal jurisdiction known as the Bronx Criminal Division.

References

Further reading

External links
 Supreme Court in New York City
 Supreme Court outside New York City
 Supreme Court in the New York Codes, Rules and Regulations
 New York Slip Opinion Service from the New York State Law Reporting Bureau
 New York Official Reports Service from West

 
New York (state) state courts
New York (state) law
1691 establishments in the Province of New York
Courts and tribunals established in 1691